The 2014 Atlantic Coast Conference men's soccer tournament was the 28th edition of the ACC Men's Soccer Tournament. The tournament decided the Atlantic Coast Conference champion and guaranteed representative into the 2014 NCAA Division I Men's Soccer Championship.

Qualification 

The top ten teams in the Atlantic Coast Conference earned a berth into the ACC Tournament. The play-in and quarterfinal rounds were held at the higher seed's home field. The semifinals and championship were held at WakeMed Soccer Park in Cary, North Carolina.

Bracket

Schedule

Play-in round

Quarterfinals

Semifinals

ACC Championship

Statistical leaders 
Note: Statistics only for tournament games.

Top scorers

Sources:

Most assists

Sources:

See also 
 Atlantic Coast Conference
 2014 Atlantic Coast Conference men's soccer season
 2014 NCAA Division I men's soccer season
 2014 NCAA Division I Men's Soccer Championship

References 

ACC Men's Soccer Tournament
Tournament
ACC Men's Soccer Tournament
ACC Men's Soccer Tournament